Several ships of the Swedish Navy have been named HSwMS Najad, named after the mythological water spirit:

  was a  launched in 1942 and decommissioned in 1966
  was a  launched in 1979

See also

Swedish Navy ship names